Alicia Cazzaniga (1928–1968) was an Argentine modernist architect. She is best known for her work in designing the National Library of the Argentine Republic.

Alicia Cazzaniga was born in Buenos Aires on July 9, 1928. She attended the National University of Buenos Aires where she studied with Francisco Bullrich and Eduardo Polledo and Horacio Baliero. 

Cazzaniga, along with Bullrich, Polledo, Bailero and others founded the Organization of Modern Architecture in 1948. The group practiced Rationalism, forming contacts with members of the Bauhaus.

In 1962, a design produced by Cazzaniga along with Francisco Bullrich, and Clorindo Testa was chosen for the new building of the National Library of the Argentine Republic.

Alicia Cazzaniga died on February 28, 1968, in Buenos Aires.

References 

Argentine women architects
Brutalist architects
1928 births
1968 deaths
20th-century Argentine architects
People from Buenos Aires
University of Buenos Aires alumni